The mute swan (Cygnus olor) is a species of swan and a member of the waterfowl family Anatidae. It is native to much of Eurosiberia, and (as a rare winter visitor) the far north of Africa. It is an introduced species in North America, home to the largest populations outside of its native range, with additional smaller introductions in Australasia and southern Africa. The name 'mute' derives from it being less vocal than other swan species. Measuring  in length, this large swan is wholly white in plumage with an orange beak bordered with black. It is recognizable by its pronounced knob atop the beak, which is larger in males.

Taxonomy

The mute swan was first formally described by the German naturalist Johann Friedrich Gmelin as Anas olor in 1789, and was transferred by Johann Matthäus Bechstein to the new genus Cygnus in 1803. Both cygnus and olor mean "swan" in Latin; cygnus is a variant form of cycnus, a borrowing from Greek  kyknos, a word of the same meaning.

Despite its Eurasian origin, its closest relatives are the black swan of Australia and the black-necked swan of South America, not the other Northern Hemisphere swans of the genus Cygnus. The species is monotypic, with no living subspecies.

Evolution
Mute swan subfossils, 6,000 years old, have been found in post-glacial peat beds of East Anglia, Great Britain. They have been recorded from Ireland east to Portugal and Italy, and from France, 13,000 BP (Desbrosse and Mourer-Chauvire 1972–1973). The paleosubspecies Cygnus olor bergmanni, which differed only in size from the living bird, is known from fossils found in Azerbaijan. A related paleospecies recorded from fossils and subfossils is the Giant swan, Cygnus falconeri, a flightless species which lived on the islands of Malta and Sicily during the Middle Pleistocene.

Fossils of swan ancestors more distantly allied to the mute swan have been found in four U.S. states: California, Arizona, Idaho and Oregon. The timeline runs from the Miocene to the late Pleistocene, or 10,000 BP. The latest find was in Anza Borrego Desert, a state park in California. Fossils from the Pleistocene include Cygnus paloregonus from Fossil Lake, Oregon, Froman's Ferry, Idaho, and Arizona, referred to by Howard in The Waterfowl of the World as "probably the mute type swan".

Description

Males are larger than females and have a larger knob on their bill. On average, this is the second largest waterfowl species after the trumpeter swan, although male mute swans can easily match or even exceed a male trumpeter in mass. The plumage is white, while the legs are dark grey. The beak of the mute swan is bright orange, with black around the nostrils and a black nail.

The mute swan is one of the heaviest flying birds.

Young birds, called cygnets, are not the bright white of mature adults, and their bill is dull greyish-black, not orange, for the first year. The down may range from pure white to grey to buff, with grey/buff the most common. The white cygnets have a leucistic gene. Cygnets grow quickly, reaching a size close to their adult size in approximately three months after hatching. Cygnets typically retain their grey feathers until they are at least one year old, with the down on their wings having been replaced by flight feathers earlier that year.

All mute swans are white at maturity, though the feathers (particularly on the head and neck) are often stained orange-brown by iron and tannins in the water.

Polish swan 

The colour morph C. o. morpha immutabilis ( is Latin for "immutable, unchangeable, unalterable"), also known as the "Polish swan", has pinkish (not dark grey) legs and dull white cygnets; as with white domestic geese, it is found only in populations with a history of domestication. Polish swans carry a copy of a gene responsible for leucism.

Behaviour

Mute swans nest on large mounds that they build with waterside vegetation in shallow water on islands in the middle or at the very edge of a lake. They are monogamous and often reuse the same nest each year, restoring or rebuilding it as needed. Male and female swans share the care of the nest, and once the cygnets are fledged it is not uncommon to see whole families looking for food. They feed on a wide range of vegetation, both submerged aquatic plants which they reach with their long necks, and by grazing on land. The food commonly includes agricultural crop plants such as oilseed rape and wheat, and feeding flocks in the winter may cause significant crop damage, often as much through trampling with their large webbed feet, as through direct consumption. It will also feed on small proportions of aquatic insects, fish and frogs.

Unlike black swans, mute swans are usually strongly territorial with just a single pair on smaller lakes, though in a few locations where a large area of suitable feeding habitat is found they can be colonial. Non-mated juveniles up to 3–4 years old commonly form larger flocks, which can total several hundred birds, often at regular traditional sites. A notable flock of non-breeding birds is found on the River Tweed estuary at Berwick-upon-Tweed in northeastern England, with a maximum count of 787 birds. A large population exists near the Swan Lifeline Station in Windsor, and live on the Thames in the shadow of Windsor Castle. Once the adults are mated they seek out their own territories and often live close to ducks and gulls, which may take advantage of the swan's ability to reach deep water weeds, which tend to spread out on the water surface.

The mute swan is less vocal than the noisy whooper and Bewick's swans; they do, however, make a variety of sounds, often described as "grunting, hoarse whistling, and snorting noises." During a courtship display, mute swans utter a rhythmic song. The song help synchronize the movements of their heads and necks. It could technically be employed to distinguish a bonded couple from two dating swans, as the rhythm of the song typically fails to match the pace of the head movements in two dating swans. Mute swans usually hiss at competitors or intruders trying to enter their territory. Cygnets are especially vocal, and communicate through a variety of whistling and chirping sounds when content, as well as a harsh squawking noise when distressed or lost.

Mute swans can be very aggressive in defence of their nests and are highly protective of their mate and offspring. Most defensive acts from a mute swan begin with a loud hiss and, if this is not sufficient to drive off the predator or intruder, are followed by a physical attack. Swans attack by striking at the threat with bony spurs in their wings, accompanied by biting with their large bill, while smaller waterbirds such as ducks are normally grabbed with the swan's bill and dragged or thrown clear of the swan and its offspring. The wings of the swan are very powerful, though not strong enough to break an adult man's leg, as is commonly misquoted. Large waterfowl, such as Canada geese, (more likely out of competition than in response to potential predation) may be aggressively driven off, and mute swans regularly attack people who enter their territory.

The cob is responsible for defending the cygnets while on the water, and will sometimes attack small watercraft, such as canoes, that it feels are a threat to its young. The cob will additionally try to chase the predator out of his family territory, and will keep animals such as foxes and raptors at bay. In New York (outside its native range), the most common predators of cygnets are common snapping turtles. Healthy adults are rarely preyed upon, though canids such as coyotes, felids such as lynx, and bears can pose a threat to infirm ones (healthy adults can usually swim away from danger and nest defense is usually successful.) and there are a few cases of healthy adults falling prey to golden eagles. In England, there has been an increased rate of attacks on swans by out-of-control dogs, especially in parks where the birds are less territorial. This is considered criminal in British law, and the birds are placed under the highest protection due to their association with the monarch. Mute swans will readily attack dogs to protect themselves and their cygnets from an attack, and an adult swan is capable of overwhelming and drowning even large dog breeds.

The familiar pose with neck curved back and wings half raised, known as busking, is a threat display. Both feet are paddled in unison during this display, resulting in more jerky movement. The swans may also use the busking posture for wind-assisted transportation over several hundred meters, so-called windsurfing.

Like other swans, mute swans are known for their ability to grieve for a lost or dead mate or cygnet. Swans will go through a mourning process, and in the case of the loss of their mate, may either stay where its counterpart lived, or fly off to join a flock. Should one of the pair die while there are cygnets present, the remaining parent will take up their partner's duties in raising the clutch.

Breeding

Mute swans lay from 4 to 10 eggs. The female broods for around 36 days, with cygnets normally hatching between the months of May and July. The young swans do not achieve the ability to fly before about 120 to 150 days old. This limits the distribution of the species at the northern edge of its range as the cygnets need to learn to fly before the ponds and lakes freeze over.

Distribution and habitat

The mute swan is found naturally mainly in temperate areas of Europe then across the Palearctic as far east as Primorsky Krai, near Sidemi.

It is partially migratory throughout northern latitudes in Europe and Asia, as far south as North Africa and the Mediterranean. It is known and recorded to have nested in Iceland and is a vagrant to that area as well as to Bermuda, according to the UN Environment Programme chart of international status chart of bird species, which places it in 70 countries, breeding in 49 countries, and vagrant in 16 countries. While most of the current population in Japan is introduced, mute swans are depicted on scrolls more than 1,000 years old, and wild birds from the mainland Asian population still occur rarely in winter. Natural migrants to Japan usually occur along with whooper and sometimes Bewick's swans.

The mute swan is protected in most of its range, but this has not prevented illegal hunting and poaching. It is often kept in captivity outside its natural range, as a decoration for parks and ponds, and escapes have happened. The descendants of such birds have become naturalised in the eastern United States and Great Lakes, much as the Canada goose has done in Europe.

World population

Native populations

The total native population of mute swans is about 500,000 birds at the end of the breeding season (adults plus young), of which up to 350,000 are in Russia. The largest single breeding concentration is 11,000 pairs in the Volga Delta.

The population in the United Kingdom is about 22,000 birds as of the 2006–2007 winter, a slight decline from the peak of about 26,000–27,000 birds in 1990. This includes about 5,300 breeding pairs, the remainder being immatures. Other significant populations in Europe include 6,800–8,300 breeding pairs in Germany, 4,500 pairs in Denmark, 4,000–4,200 pairs in Poland, 3,000–4,000 pairs in the Netherlands, about 2,500 pairs in Ireland, and 1,200–1,700 pairs in Ukraine.

For many centuries, mute swans in Great Britain were domesticated for food, with individuals being marked by nicks on their webs (feet) or beaks to indicate ownership. These marks were registered with the Crown and a Royal Swanherd was appointed. Any birds not so marked became Crown property, hence the swan becoming known as the "Royal Bird". It is quite possible that this domestication saved the mute swan from extirpation through overhunting in Great Britain.

Populations in western Europe were largely exterminated by hunting pressure in the 13th–19th centuries, with the exception of semi-domesticated birds maintained as poultry by large landowners. Better protection in the late 19th and early 20th centuries allowed birds to return to most or all of their former range. More recently in the period from about 1960 up to the early 1980s, numbers declined significantly again in many areas in England, primarily due to lead poisoning from birds swallowing lead shot from shooting and discarded fishing weights made from lead. After lead weights and shot were mostly replaced by other less toxic alternatives, mute swan numbers increased again rapidly.

Introduced populations
Since being introduced into North America, the mute swan has increased greatly in number to the extent that it is considered as an invasive species there. Populations introduced into other areas remain small, with around 200 in Japan, fewer than 200 in New Zealand and Australia, and about 120 in South Africa.

North America
The mute swan was introduced to North America in the late 19th century. Recently, it has been widely viewed as an invasive species because of its rapidly increasing numbers and its adverse effects on other waterfowl and native ecosystems. For example, a study of population sizes in the lower Great Lakes from 1971 to 2000 found that mute swan numbers were increasing at an average rate of at least 10% per year, doubling the population every seven to eight years. Several studies have concluded that mute swans severely reduce densities of submerged vegetation where they occur.

In 2003, the U.S. Fish and Wildlife Service proposed to "minimize environmental damages attributed to Mute Swans" by reducing their numbers in the Atlantic Flyway to pre-1986 levels, a 67% reduction at the time. According to a report published in the Federal Register of 2003 the proposal was supported by all thirteen state wildlife agencies which submitted comments, as well as by 43 bird conservation, wildlife conservation and wildlife management organisations. Ten animal rights organisations and the vast majority of comments from individuals were opposed. At this time mute swans were protected under the Migratory Bird Treaty Act due to a court order, but in 2005 the United States Department of the Interior officially declared them a non-native, unprotected species. Mute swans are protected in some areas of the U.S. by local laws as, for example, in Connecticut.

The status of the mute swan as an introduced species in North America is disputed by the interest group "Save the Mute Swans". They assert that mute swans are native in the region and therefore deserving of protection. They claim that mute swans had origins from Russia and cite historical sightings and fossil records. These claims have been rejected as specious by the U.S. Department of the Interior.

Oceania
The mute swan had absolute protection in New Zealand under the Wildlife Act 1953, but this was changed in June 2010 to a lower level of protection. It still has protection, but is now allowed to be killed or held in captivity at the discretion of the Minister of Conservation.

A small feral population exists in the vicinity of Perth, Australia; however, it is believed to number less than 100 individuals.

In popular culture

The mute swan has been the national bird of Denmark since 1984. Prior to that, the skylark was considered Denmark's national bird (since 1960).

The fairy tale "The Ugly Duckling" by Hans Christian Andersen tells the story of a cygnet ostracised by his fellow barnyard fowl because of his perceived unattractiveness. To his delight (and to the surprise of others), he matures into a graceful swan, the most beautiful bird of all.

Today, the British Monarch retains the right to ownership of all unmarked mute swans in open water, but King Charles III exercises his ownership only on certain stretches of the Thames and its surrounding tributaries. This ownership is shared with the Vintners' and Dyers' Companies, who were granted rights of ownership by the Crown in the 15th century.

The mute swans in the moat at the Bishops Palace at Wells Cathedral in Wells, England have for centuries been trained to ring bells via strings attached to them to beg for food. Two swans are still able to ring for lunch.

The pair of swans in the Boston Public Garden are named Romeo and Juliet after the Shakespearean couple; however, it was found that both of them are females.

Gallery

See also
 Swan Upping
 The Bird of Peace (statue)

References

External links

 
 
 mtDNA Mute Swan video The mitochondrial DNA sequence of 'Cygnus olor' translated into music.
 

Anatidae
mute swan
Birds of Asia
Birds of Europe
Birds of Central Asia
Birds of North America
Birds of Western Asia
Articles containing video clips
mute swan
mute swan